Protea aurea, the long-bud sugarbush, is a shrub or small tree with a single trunk occurring in mountain fynbos, usually on cool, moist, southern slopes. It is endemic to the Cape Provinces of South Africa.

The flowerheads are solitary and resemble a shuttlecock when open. Fruit is a densely hairy nut. Two subspecies are recognised: subsp. aurea and subsp. potbergensis with the later being rare and restricted to the Potberg.

References

van Wyk, B. and van Wyk, P. 1997. Field Guide to trees of South Africa. Struik, Cape Town
Pooley, E. 2005. A Field Guide to Wild Flowers of Kwazulu-Natal and the Eastern Region. National Floral Publications Trust, Durban

aurea
Flora of the Cape Provinces
Endemic flora of South Africa
Taxa named by Nicolaas Laurens Burman